Kampionato means championship in Papiamento, the creole language of Dutch Caribbean, may refer to:
 Kampionato (Bonaire), a football league of Bonaire
 Kampionato Antiano, former football league of the Netherlands Antilles
 Kampionato (Curaçao), a football league of Curaçao